Every year the Communauté de Taizé organises a European youth meeting for teenagers and young adults. They take place in a European city, usually between Christmas and New year.
At the meetings it is usually announced, were the next European youth meeting will take place.

European young adults meeting

 1978 – Paris, France
 1979 – Barcelona, Spain
 1980 – Rome, Italy
 1981 – London, United Kingdom
 1982 – Rome, Italy
 1983 – Paris, France
 1984 – Cologne, Germany
 1985 – Barcelona, Spain
 1986 – London, United Kingdom
 1987 – Rome, Italy
 1988 – Paris, France
 1989 – Wrocław, Poland
 1990 – Prague, Czechoslovakia
 1991 – Budapest, Hungary
 1992 – Vienna, Austria
 1993 – Munich, Germany
 1994 – Paris, France
 1995 – Wrocław, Poland
 1996 – Stuttgart, Germany
 1997 – Vienna, Austria
 1998 – Milan, Italy
 1999 – Warsaw, Poland
 2000 – Barcelona, Spain
 2001 – Budapest, Hungary
 2002 – Paris, France
 2003 – Hamburg, Germany
 2004 – Lisbon, Portugal
 2005 – Milan, Italy
 2006 – Zagreb, Croatia
 2007 – Geneva, Switzerland
 2008 – Brussels, Belgium
 2009 – Poznań, Poland
 2010 – Rotterdam, Netherlands
 2011 – Berlin, Germany
 2012 – Rome, Italy
 2013 – Strasbourg, France
 2014 – Prague, Czech Republic
 2015 – Valencia, Spain
 2016 – Riga, Latvia
 2017 – Basel, Switzerland
 2018 – Madrid, Spain
 2019 – Wrocław, Poland
 2020 – Turin, Italy (cancelled because of COVID-19 and conducted online from Taizé)
 2021 – Turin, Italy
 2022 - Rostock, Germany
 2023 - Ljublijana, Slovenia

International young adults meeting

 1986 - Madras, India
 1991 – Manila, Philippines
 2006 – Kolkata, India
 2007 – Cochabamba, Bolivia
 2008 – Nairobi, Kenya
 2009 – Vilnius, Lithuania
 2010 – Manila, Philippines
 2010 – Santiago, Chile
 2012 – Kigali, Rwanda
 2012 – Chicago, Illinois, United States
 2013 – Red Shirt, Pine Ridge Indian Reservation, South Dakota, United States
 2014 – Mexico City, Mexico
 2016 – Cotonou, Benin
 2017 - St. Louis, Missouri, United States
 2018 - Hong Kong
 2019 - Cape Town, South Africa
 2022 - Holy Land,  Israël

See also
 Taizé Community

External links
 Introduction to European Meetings (film)
 Official Taizé Community website
 

Taize meetings
Christianity-related lists